Nuala O'Donnell (Irish: Nuala Ní Dhomhnaill; c. 1565 - 1630) was a member of the O'Donnell dynasty in sixteenth century Ireland who took part in the 1607 Flight of the Earls.

Biography
Nuala was the daughter of Sir Hugh O'Donnell, the Gaelic lord of Tyrconnell and head of the O'Donnells. Her siblings include her full brother Sir Donnell O'Donnell and her half-brothers Hugh Roe O'Donnell, Rory O'Donnell and Cathbarr O'Donnell. She was also a sister-in-law of Hugh O'Neill, Earl of Tyrone due to his marriage with her sister Siobhán. Much of her family became engulfed in the violent O'Donnell succession dispute of the 1580s and 1590s, as various claimants attempted to secure the right to succeed her father even while Sir Hugh was still alive. Her elder brother Donnell was killed in battle in 1590 by Scottish redshank mercenaries hired by her stepmother Iníon Dubh, allowing her half-brother Hugh Roe to emerge victorious by 1592.

Nuala made a dynastic marriage with Niall Garve O'Donnell, a cousin and a rival claimant to the O'Donnell lordship. After the marriage Niall Garve became an ally of Hugh Roe and joined him after he took part in the 1594 Siege of Enniskillen, triggering the nine-year Tyrone's Rebellion. However Niall Garve, along with three of his brothers and many followers, dramatically switched sides and began assisting Crown forces under the English commander Sir Henry Docwra who were operating out of Derry. He led forces during the Crown victories at the Battle of Lifford and Siege of Donegal, and had troops of the Royal Irish Army placed under his command. Niall's ambition was to have himself declared the Gaelic lord of Tyrconnell.

When Nuala heard of her husband's defection, Nuala left him and returned to live with her brother Hugh Roe, taking some of her children with her. In a furious reaction to Niall Garve's betrayal, Hugh Roe reportedly beat his infant son (and his own nephew) to death. Nuala subsequently divorced Niall. Following her brother Hugh Roe's death in 1602, she joined the household of his successor Rory, who was made Earl of Tyrconnell following the Treaty of Mellifont which made peace with the Crown.

In 1607 she took part in the Flight of the Earls which took several Gaelic nobles, including her brother Rory, into Continental exile. She played a role in the raising of Rory's son Hugh, whose mother had remained behind in Ireland. She appears to have died in Rome. Her surviving child with Niall Garve, Grania O'Donnell, had accompanied her into Italian exile.

Family tree

References

Bibliography
 McGurk, Johnv (2006). Sir Henry Docwra, 1564-1631: Derry's Second Founder. Four Courts Press.
 Morgan, Hiram (1999). Tyrone's Rebellion. Boydell Press.
 
 Swords, Liamv(2007). The Flight of the Earls: A Popular History. Columba.

External links
 Women in Flight at History Ireland

1660s births
1630 deaths
16th-century Irish people
17th-century Irish people
People of Elizabethan Ireland
Year of birth unknown
Year of death unknown
People from County Donegal
Nuala
Emigrants from the Kingdom of Ireland to Italy